251 Sophia is a stony background asteroid from the outer regions of the asteroid belt. It was discovered on 4 October 1885, by astronomer Johann Palisa at the Vienna Observatory in Austria. It was named after Sophia von Seeliger, wife of German astronomer Hugo von Seeliger (1849–1924).

Orbit and classification 

Sophia is a non-family asteroid of the main belt's background population when applying the hierarchical clustering method to its proper orbital elements. It orbits the Sun in the outer asteroid belt at a distance of 2.8–3.4 AU once every 5 years and 6 months (1,996 days; semi-major axis of 3.1 AU). Its orbit has an eccentricity of 0.10 and an inclination of 11° with respect to the ecliptic. The body's observation arc begins at Vienna Observatory with its official discovery observation on 4 October 1885.

Naming 

This minor planet was  after Sophia von Seeliger (née Stoeltzel), wife of German astronomer Hugo von Seeliger (1849–1924) on the occasion of their marriage (A. Schnell). The naming likely took place in 1885, on the meeting of the Astronomische Gesellschaft in Geneva, Switzerland. Seeliger, who proposed the name to the discoverer, was later honored with asteroid 892 Seeligeria, discovered by Max Wolf in 1918.

Physical characteristics 

In the Tholen-like taxonomy of the Small Solar System Objects Spectroscopic Survey (S3OS2), Sophia is a common, stony S-type asteroid, while in the survey's Bus–Binzel (SMASS) taxonomic variant, it is an Sl-subtype, which transitions from the S-type to the uncommon L-type. In the SDSS-based taxonomy, it is an L-type asteroid

Rotation period and poles 

In December 2000, a rotational lightcurve of Sophia was obtained from photometric observations by Bill Holliday in New Braunfels, Texas. Lightcurve analysis gave a well-defined rotation period of  hours with a brightness variation of  magnitude. Between 2005 and 2013, additional observations by French amateur astronomers Laurent Bernasconi, Etienne Morelle and René Roy gave a tentative period of  hours with an amplitude between 0.25 and 0.61.

Modeled lightcurves by Josef Ďurech and Josef Hanuš, using photometric data including from the Lowell Photometric Database and from the Wide-field Infrared Survey Explorer (WISE) were published in 2018. Hanuš also gave two spin axes at (235.0°, −52.0°) and (47.0°, 84.0°) in ecliptic coordinates (λ, β).

Diameter and albedo 

The Collaborative Asteroid Lightcurve Link derives an albedo of 0.2377 and a diameter of 28.54 kilometers based on an absolute magnitude of 9.9.

References

External links 
 Lightcurve Database Query (LCDB), at www.minorplanet.info
 Dictionary of Minor Planet Names, Google books
 Asteroids and comets rotation curves, CdR – Geneva Observatory, Raoul Behrend
 Discovery Circumstances: Numbered Minor Planets (1)-(5000) – Minor Planet Center
 
 

000251
Discoveries by Johann Palisa
Named minor planets
18851004